The Robber Bride is a Margaret Atwood novel first published by McClelland and Stewart in 1993.

Plot summary 
Set in present-day Toronto, Ontario, the novel is about three women and their history with old friend and nemesis, Zenia. Roz, Charis, and Tony meet once a month in a restaurant to share a meal decades after Zenia betrayed them and interfered with their romantic relationships. During one outing they spot Zenia, who they thought to be long-dead since their university days. The plot then travels back in time to explain how Zenia stole, one by one, their respective partners. The novel alternates between the present and the past through flashbacks, in the third person perspective of Tony, Charis and Roz. Zenia gives each woman a different version of her biography, tailor-made to insinuate herself into their lives. No one version of Zenia is the truth, and the reader knows no more than the characters.

Their betrayals by Zenia are what initially bring the three together as friends and bind their lives together irrevocably - their monthly luncheons begin after her funeral. 

In the present-day, Roz, Charis and Tony each individually confront Zenia in a Toronto hotel room, where she tells each of them that the men they'd been with got what they deserved. She explains various versions of her earlier staged death, each as implausible as the accounts of her life.

Themes
The novel, like many other works by Atwood, deals with power struggles between men and women, while also being a meditation on the nature of female friendship, power and trust. Zenia's character can be read as either the ultimate self-empowered woman - a traitor who abuses sisterhood - or a self-interested mercenary who cunningly uses the "war between the sexes" to further her own interests. One interpretation posits Zenia as a kind of guardian angel to the women, saving them from unworthy men. This proposition comes as the conclusion of Atwood's later short story, "I Dream of Zenia with the Bright Red Teeth", which features the same characters.

Canadian literary critic Brian Busby wrote in his book Character Parts: Who's Really Who in Canlit that the character of Zenia was based on journalist Barbara Amiel.

Film adaptation 
A film adaptation of The Robber Bride, starring Mary-Louise Parker as Zenia, Wendy Crewson as Roz, Greg Bryk as Henry, Shawn Doyle as John, Susan Lynch as Charis, Amanda Root as Tony, Tatiana Maslany as Augusta and Brandon Firla as West, aired on CBC Television in January 2007 and the Oxygen Network in March 2007.

The adaptation altered the plotline, choosing not to show Roz, Tony and Charis' childhood flashbacks and adding several new characters. In addition, Augusta is taken by Zenia and the Toxique has been changed to Absinthe.

Sequel
In 2014, Atwood published the short story "I Dream of Zenia with the Bright Red Teeth", which revisits Roz, Tony and Charis in the present day, when Charis believes that her new pet dog Ouida is possessed by the spirit of Zenia. Originally published by the Canadian magazine The Walrus, the story also appears in her 2014 short story collection Stone Mattress.

References

External links 
 

1993 Canadian novels
Canadian novels adapted into films
Novels by Margaret Atwood
Novels set in Toronto
McClelland & Stewart books